Sharon Hedrick (née Rahn, born April 26, 1956) is an American former paralympic swimmer, wheelchair racer and wheelchair basketballer.

Hedrick was born in Horsham, Pennsylvania. At the age of nine, she was accidentally shot by a 12-year-old boy playing with a loaded gun. This left her paralyzed from the waist down.

Hedrick is the only US athlete to have won gold in both the Olympic and Paralympic Games.

Eight-time Boston Marathon winner and Paralympic athlete, Jean Driscoll, cites Hedrick as one of her sporting inspirations.

Athletic career 

Sharon Hedrick did not get involved in wheelchair sports until she was 19, when she was seen training her dog at a local fair and encouraged to join Temple University's athletic team.

She went on to play for the wheelchair basketball team at the University of Illinois, winning six MVP awards.

In 1977 Hedrick was the first female wheelchair competitor in the Boston Marathon; she finished with a time of 3:48:51.

In 1980 Hedrick competed in the Paralympic Games for the first time as a wheelchair basketballer. The team gained the bronze medal. Hedricks did not compete in the 1984 team which failed to bring a medal home, but returned to win gold and then silver in the two subsequent games in Seoul 1988, and Barcelona 1992.

In 1984 Hedrick turned down a place on the Paralympic team  to become the first wheelchair athlete in the world to win a gold track medal at an Olympic Games by breaking the world record. She finished with a time of 2:15.73. She successfully defended this title at the following games in South Korea.

1990 saw the first Women's World Wheelchair Basketball Championships in St. Etienne, France. Hedrick claimed gold as part of the winning USA team.

Honors 

In 1977 Hedrick won the Top Female Athlete Award at the National Wheelchair Games.
In 1985 she was presented with the Southland Olympia Award, which recognizes excellence in sport and the embodiment of the 'amateur ideal'. Hedrick was the first wheelchair athlete to be presented this award.
Hedrick was awarded the Jack Gerhardt Outstanding Wheelchair Athlete Award in 1988.
Also in 1988 Hedrick was the recipient of the Athlete of the Year Award from USOC.

In 1989 the Women's Sports Foundation nominated Hedrick in their list of the Top 10 Women Athletes in America.

In 1991 Hedrick's alma mater, Hatboro-Horsham High School, inducted her into their Athletics Hall of Fame

In 1992 Hedrick was inducted into the WASUSA Hall Of Fame.

In 1994 Hedrick became the first woman to be inducted into the National Wheelchair Basketball Association Hall of Fame.

2012 saw Hedrick becoming a member of Barack Obama's Presidential Delegation to the London Paralympic Games alongside fellow wheelchair athlete Jean Driscoll.

Personal life 

Hedrick is married to Dr. Brad Hedrick, a basketball coach and Director of the Division of Disability Resources and Education Services (DRES) at the University of Illinois. Hedrick was coached by her husband in the USA Women's Wheelchair Basketball team in 1988 when the team won their first gold.
They have one adopted son, Nathan.

Hedrick is now retired

Selected works

Books 
 Introduction to Wheelchair Track & Field – with Brad Hedrick and S. Figoni (1995).
 A Guide for Wheelchair Sports Training (1988)

Book chapters 
 Women's wheelchair basketball. In A Century of Women's Basketball: From Frailty to Final Four. pp. 367–378. - with Brad Hedrick (1991)

References

External links 
 

1956 births
Living people
People from Horsham Township, Pennsylvania
University of Illinois alumni
American women's wheelchair basketball players
American female wheelchair racers
American female swimmers
American sports coaches
Wheelchair racers at the 1984 Summer Olympics
Wheelchair racers at the 1988 Summer Olympics
Paralympic wheelchair racers
Medalists at the 1976 Summer Paralympics
Medalists at the 1980 Summer Paralympics
Medalists at the 1988 Summer Paralympics
Medalists at the 1992 Summer Paralympics
Paralympic gold medalists for the United States
Paralympic silver medalists for the United States
Paralympic bronze medalists for the United States
People with paraplegia
Sportspeople from Pennsylvania
American shooting survivors
Sports coaches from Illinois
Olympic wheelchair racers of the United States
Paralympic medalists in wheelchair basketball
Swimmers at the 1976 Summer Paralympics
Paralympic medalists in swimming
Wheelchair basketball players at the 1980 Summer Paralympics
Wheelchair basketball players at the 1988 Summer Paralympics
Wheelchair basketball players at the 1992 Summer Paralympics
Paralympic medalists in athletics (track and field)
Athletes (track and field) at the 1976 Summer Paralympics
Athletes (track and field) at the 1980 Summer Paralympics
Paralympic track and field athletes of the United States
Paralympic wheelchair basketball players of the United States
21st-century American women